Elysia lobata is a species of sea slug, a marine gastropod mollusc in the family Plakobranchidae. This sea slug resembles a nudibranch, but it is not closely related to that order of gastropods, instead it is a sacoglossan.

Description
In his original short description of the species in 1852, Augustus Addison Gould wrote: "Animal slug-like, greenish, dotted with black, and bordered with yellow; edge of mantle expanded in to a three lobed lateral wing. Head small with very large and long tentacles, tipped with sky-blue".

Distribution
Elysia lobata is found in Hawaii, the Marshall Islands and parts of Japan.

References

Plakobranchidae
Molluscs of the Pacific Ocean
Gastropods described in 1852
Taxa named by Augustus Addison Gould